Steganocerus multipunctatus Thunberg 1783, or ladybird bug, is a Sub-Saharan African member of the Hemiptera with a strong resemblance to a Ladybird. It is normally black with bright orange spots, but is quite variable in colour and may be brown without spots. It shares Müllerian mimicry with the Tortoise beetle Chiridopsis suffriani, and a spider Paraplectana thorntoni.

S. multipunctatus is one of the Rhynchota whose presence has been recorded on a wide range of indigenous plants and cultivated crops such as cotton.

References

External links
Images on Project Noah
Images on iSpot
"Revision of the Rhynchota belonging to the family Pentatomidae in the Hope collection at Oxford" - W. L. Distant
"Ad cognitionem Heteropterorum Africae occidentalis" - Odo Morannal Reuter
"Enumeratio Hemipterorum. Bidrag till en förteckning öfver alla hittills kända Hemiptera, jemte systematiska meddelanden" - Carl Stål

Scutelleridae
Hemiptera of Africa